The 2022 GT4 European Series is the fifteenth season of the GT4 European Series, a Sports car racing championship organised by Stéphane Ratel Organisation (SRO). The season began at Imola on 1 April, and will end at the Circuit de Barcelona-Catalunya on 30 September.

Calendar 
The 2022 calendar was announced via the website on 4 September 2021.

Entry list 
The full season entry list was released on 23 March and contained 50 cars.

Race calendar and results 
Bold indicates the overall winner.

Championship standings 

 Scoring system

Championship points were awarded for the first ten positions in each race. The drivers of the car setting the fastest time in the Silver, Pro-Am and Am Cups in Q1 and Q2 individually will be awarded one point. Entries were required to complete 75% of the winning car's race distance in order to be classified and earn points. Individual drivers were required to participate for a minimum of 25 minutes in order to earn championship points in any race.

Race-by-race entrants must compete in at least one of the first four races if they wish to score points in the final two races.

Drivers' championship

Team's championship 
Championship points were awarded for the first ten positions in each race. After Q1 and Q2 the Team of the car setting the fastest time in the Silver, Pro-Am and Am Cups will be awarded one point. For the Teams titles Silver, Pro-Am and Am, only the highest-finishing car per Team will score points; all other cars entered by that Team will be invisible as far as scoring points are concerned.

Silver Cup

Pro-Am

Am

Notes

References

External links 

 

GT4 European Series
GT4 European Series
GT4 European Series